John De Mott (October 7, 1790 – July 31, 1870) was an American businessman and politician who served one term as a U.S. Representative from New York from 1845 to 1847.

Biography 
Born in Readington, New Jersey, De Mott moved to Herkimer County, New York, in 1793 with his parents, who settled in what is now the town of Lodi, Seneca County.
He attended the common schools.
He pursued an academic course.
Major general of the Thirty-eighth Brigade of the State militia.
Supervisor in the town of Covert in 1823 and 1824 and of Lodi in 1826, 1827, 1829, and 1830.
He engaged in mercantile pursuits in Lodi, New York, for more than forty years.
He served as member of the State assembly in 1833.
He was an unsuccessful candidate for election in 1840 to the Twenty-seventh Congress.

Congress 
De Mott was elected as a Democrat to the Twenty-ninth Congress (March 4, 1845 – March 3, 1847).
He was not a candidate for renomination in 1846.

Later career and death 
He resumed his former business pursuits and also engaged in the banking business.

He died in Lodi, New York, July 31, 1870.
He was interred in Evergreen Cemetery, Ovid, New York.

References

1790 births
1870 deaths
American militia generals
Democratic Party members of the New York State Assembly
Democratic Party members of the United States House of Representatives from New York (state)
People from Readington Township, New Jersey
People from Lodi, New York
19th-century American politicians
Military personnel from New Jersey